Energy & Fuels is a peer-reviewed scientific journal published by the American Chemical Society. It was established in 1987. Its publication frequency switched from bimonthly to monthly in 2009. The editor-in-chief is Hongwei Wu (Curtin University).

According to the American Chemical Society, Energy & Fuels publishes reports of research in the technical area defined by the intersection of the disciplines of chemistry and chemical engineering and the application domain of non-nuclear energy and fuels.

Editors
The following are the current list of Associate Editors serving the Journal.

 Anthony Dufour, The National Center for Scientific Research (CNRS)
 H. Scott Fogler, University of Michigan
 Praveen Linga, National University of Singapore
 Anja Oasmaa, VTT Technical Research Centre of Finland Ltd.
 Ah-Hyung (Alissa) Park, Columbia University
 Andrew Pomerantz, Schlumberger-Doll
 Luiz P. Ramos, Federal University of Parana
 Ryan P. Rodgers, Florida State University
 Zongping Shao, Nanjing Tech University
 John M. Shaw, University of Alberta
 Jennifer Wilcox, Worcester Polytechnic Institute
 Minghou Xu, Huazhong University of Science and Technology

Abstracting and indexing 
The journal is abstracted and indexed in:

According to the Journal Citation Reports, the journal has a 2021 Journal Impact Factor of 4.654

References

External links 
 

American Chemical Society academic journals
Energy and fuel journals
Publications established in 1987
Monthly journals
English-language journals